Carsten Pröpper (born 20 October 1967) is a German former professional footballer who played as a midfielder. He is a son of Günter Pröpper and first cousin of Michael and Thomas Pröpper, all footballers as well.

References

1967 births
Living people
German footballers
Association football midfielders
Bundesliga players
2. Bundesliga players
Wuppertaler SV players
FC Remscheid players
FC St. Pauli players
Rot-Weiß Oberhausen players
People from Remscheid
Sportspeople from Düsseldorf (region)
Footballers from North Rhine-Westphalia